Ling Long or Linglong may refer to:

 Ling Long (magazine), a Chinese women's magazine
 Ling Long (mathematician) (born 1970s), Chinese mathematician
 Ling Long Pagoda, an Olympic broadcasting studio in Beijing, China
 Linglong Tire, a Chinese tire manufacturing company
 Linglong SuperLiga, a Serbian professional football league sponsored by Linglong Tire